Karim-e Saleh (also Romanized as Karīm-e Şāleh and Karīm-e Şāleḩ) is a village in Bani Saleh Rural District, Neysan District, Hoveyzeh County, Khuzestan Province, Iran. At the 2006 census, its population was 532, in 102 families.

References 

Populated places in Hoveyzeh County